Vladimír Boudník (17 March 1924 in Prague – 5 December 1968 in Prague) was a graphic artist, photographer and a key figure in Czech post-war art, and a representative of the "explosionism" movement. He is best known for his active and structural graphic art, but also created mostly photographic and monotype works that, until recently, remained unknown.

Biography
During World War II Boudník  was sent to forced labor in Germany, an experience that resulted in a lifelong trauma. After the war, he attended art school, where he studied printmaking. He spent a brief period working in advertising before getting a job at an ironworks in Kladno, where he met Bohumil Hrabal. In 1952 Boudník, began working for ČKD Works in Prague. The factory environment served as an inspiration for his "active graphics" made of industrial material and waste. In 1968, Boudník committed suicide while experimenting with asphyxiation.

Boudník as an artist
Boudník worked mostly in graphics, and developed a number of innovative printmaking techniques. He was also one of the first Czech artist to begin working with the general public, organizing "happenings" and interacting with psychiatric patients.

His work had a large influence on many contemporary Czech artists, especially author Bohumil Hrabal, with whom he shared many years of friendship. Boudník appears in several texts by Hrabal, most notably the novella The Gentle Barbarian.

Since 1995, the city of Prague has annually awarded the Vladimír Boudník Award (Cena Vladimíra Boudníka) to a living Czech printmaking artist. Notable recipients include Jan Kubíček.

At least five volumes of collected works and correspondence of Vladimír Boudník have been published since the 1990s.

Literature
 Něžný Barbar (The Gentle Barbarian), Bohumil Hrabal, Prague: Petlice 1973 (underground publishing house); Exile edition: Index, Köln, 1981. The novel features Boudník.
 Zdeněk Primus (ed.), Vít Havránek, Vladislav Merhaut, Martin Pilař, Jan Rous, Jiří Valoch: Vladimír Boudník mezi avantgardou a undergroudem [ Vladimír Boudník between the avant-garde and underground ], 2004, . Monograph tracing Boudník's life and works.

References

External links 

 Artist Vladimír Boudník ARTLIST-  database of contemporary Czech art
 Overview of Boudník's works, PP 2004
 The Prague Post 2007
 Biography in Czech
 Photo galleries of Boudník's paintings : , .
 Death Sought Boudník out on St Nicholas Day Portal of Prague, 2008

Czech artists
Vysočany Circle
1924 births
1968 suicides
Artists from Prague
Czech graphic designers
Photographers from Prague
Suicides by asphyxiation
Artists who committed suicide
Suicides in Czechoslovakia
Czechoslovak World War II forced labourers